Failures of State: The Inside Story of Britain’s Battle with Coronavirus is a 2021 book by George Arbuthnott and Jonathan Calvert about the COVID-19 pandemic in the United Kingdom. The book is adapted from Calvert and Arbuthnott's reporting on the pandemic for The Sunday Times. It focuses on responses of the British government and National Health Service to the onset of the pandemic.


Content 
Failures of State covers the COVID-19 pandemic in the United Kingdom and the British government's response from the onset of the pandemic in January 2020 to early 2021. It begins with the initial outbreak in mainland China, accusing the Chinese government of covering up the outbreak and also expresses support for the lab leak theory. It suggests that the British government underestimated the threat of the virus in early 2020, inadequately preparing and responding slowly to the outbreak, leading to shortages of PPE and linking the slow response to a high death toll compared to other nations. The book is particularly critical of the leadership of Prime Minister Boris Johnson during the crisis. This includes his non-attendance of five COBR briefings during early 2020, and suggests him and others in the government were preoccupied with Brexit in early 2020. It also explores the strain the pandemic had on the National Health Service and Britain's health care system. They also accuse the government of disinformation in their response to the authors' reporting during the pandemic.

Reception 
The book was acclaimed in The Guardian, The Times, The Scotsman and The Observer.

References 

2021 non-fiction books
Media depictions of the COVID-19 pandemic in the United Kingdom
Books about the COVID-19 pandemic
Investigative journalism
Works originally published in The Sunday Times
British non-fiction books
Books about politics of the United Kingdom